Rex House, also known as the Gemberling-Rex House, is a historic home located at Schaefferstown in Heidelberg Township, Lebanon County, Pennsylvania. It was built in 1729 by early Pennsylvania German settlers, and is a -story, half timbered residence with originally scored plaster exterior, now horizontal wooden siding and a gable roof.  It is measures 32 feet by 12 feet and has gable end brick chimneys.  Also on the property are a contributing smoke house, bake oven, stone foundation of a barn and outhouse and cistern.

History
Originally a modest three-room structure, by 1798 it was radically altered to include refinements of the Anglo-American elite after which it was purchased by Samuel Rex, who was Schaefferstown's most prominent resident. The home and its occupants represent the product "of cultural conflict between the English majority and an ethnic German minority," where historians contend there was pressure of Pennsylvania Germans to culturally conform.

The Gemberling-Rex House is open for tours as part of the Historic Schaefferstown museum.

It was added to the National Register of Historic Places in 1980.

References

External links
Historic Schaefferstown website

Houses on the National Register of Historic Places in Pennsylvania
Houses completed in 1729
Houses in Lebanon County, Pennsylvania
Museums in Lebanon County, Pennsylvania
Historic house museums in Pennsylvania
National Register of Historic Places in Lebanon County, Pennsylvania
1729 establishments in Pennsylvania
Historic House Museums of the Pennsylvania Germans